Lichen Peak is a peak standing between Saunders Mountain and the Swanson Mountains in the Ford Ranges of Marie Byrd Land, Antarctica. It was discovered in December 1934 by the Byrd Antarctic Expedition sledge party under Paul Siple, and so named because of the lichens and other botanical specimens obtained there.

References

Mountains of Marie Byrd Land